The Scholastic Rowing Association of America was formed as the Schoolboy Rowing Association of America in 1935 to host an unofficial national championship regatta for high school rowing. The name was changed in 1976 after women were allowed to compete.

On May 28, 2022, Winter Park Crew Women's Varsity 8 (V8) boat won the SRAA National Championship.  The boat included Delaney Gardner, Paige Perrott, Susie Mallen, Reilly Harris, Hannah Hill, Ashley Perrott, Kate Miller, Ava May, and Zoe DeFeo.  The boat was coached by Michael Vertullo.

Qualifying regattas
The following regattas are regional qualifiers for the SRAA National Championships.
Florida Scholastic Rowing Association Championships
Midwest Scholastic Rowing Association Championships
Garden State Scholastic Championship
New York State Scholastic Championship
Philadelphia City Championship
Virginia Scholastic Rowing Championships
Washington Metropolitan Interscholastic Rowing Association Championships
West Coast Scholastic Championships

References

External links

Rowing associations
High school sports associations in the United States
1935 establishments in the United States
Scholastic rowing in the United States